Norton School was a secondary school in Letchworth, Hertfordshire that was founded in 1905 and which closed in 2002 following a period of being in special measures. It has since been partially demolished and redeveloped as a collection of housing and apartments by Miller Homes.

History

Originally named Norton Road School, the school was designed by Raymond Unwin. It was built in a quadrangle with a courtyard for open-air teaching and to allow plentiful light and movement of air. These principles were later to become standard in school design but were very innovative at the time.

Over the decades since its foundation, Norton School saw great expansion as pupil numbers grew, with various teaching blocks being added to accommodate these increasing numbers.

In the 1957 the school hand bell disappeared, never to be seen again until 2003, when the school site was being redeveloped for housing; a hand bell was discovered hidden under a man hole cover. The nand bell was taken and hid on the last day of school in June 1957 by Colin Thompson a pupil of Norton Rd with 2 other accomplices. I know! i am Colin Thompson.I did try and retrieve it before the school demolition, but all was covered by a number of carpets, In the day it was wooden flooring.I attended the school fron 1953 to 1957.

In its last year the school's thirty-two staff comprised thirteen staff on temporary contracts and nine from overseas - eight from South Africa and one from Jamaica. Fifteen of the staff joined the school in September 2001. In its final year Norton School was taken over by The Knights Templar School in neighbouring Baldock, and was renamed 'The Knights Templar School in Letchworth'. At this time the Norton School uniform of a sweat shirt was replaced with the Knights Templar uniform of jacket (with school badge) and school tie.

Following closure, pupils primarily transferred to The Knights Templar School, while others transferred to the nearby Highfield School and Fearnhill School.

Former Headmasters
C.A. Pease, BA (1905-1917)
J.H. Haysman, JP (1917-1949)
Edgar John, BA (1949-1975)
Peter Wall, MA (1976-1995)
Keith Wadsworth (1995-1999)
Amanda Roberts (2000-2001)
Peter Chapman MA (2001-2002), Headmaster of The Knights Templar School, with Associate Head Amanda Roberts (2001-2002)

Notable former pupils and staff
Shaun Hutson the horror writer attended the school
Glenn Christodoulou, Chairman of the Crimean War Research Society, taught at the school (1981-1989)
Dr Chris Howard OBE, former Head of History at the school and former Headteacher  at the Lewis School in Pengam and President of NAHT Wales (2009)

References

External links
'School could close for lack of good teachers', The Guardian 22 March 2002

Defunct schools in Hertfordshire
Educational institutions established in 1905
Educational institutions disestablished in 2002
1905 establishments in England
2002 disestablishments in England
Letchworth
Buildings and structures in Letchworth